Cayuga Heights is a village in Tompkins County, New York, United States, and an upscale suburb of Ithaca. The population was 4,114 at the 2020 census.

The Village of Cayuga Heights is in the Town of Ithaca, directly northeast of the City of Ithaca and the main campus of Cornell University. 

The village is home to many faculty members at Cornell University, including its president.

History
After the Revolutionary War, much of Upstate New York was divided into tracts to be given to veterans. Several veterans received lots in what is now Cayuga Heights and started farms.

In the early 1800s, Ithaca started to grow as a small city and inland port. In 1865, Ezra Cornell started Cornell University. Students and faculty members initially lived on campus and in Ithaca, but rapid expansion in the late 1800s and early 1900s spurred new development north of the Fall Creek gorge. Two trolley bridges were built across the gorge, and a streetcar connected downtown, Cornell, and the budding residential development north of the gorge.

In 1901, local businessmen Charles Newman and Jared Blood bought nearly 1,000 acres of farmland and started the Cayuga Heights Land Company. They hired landscape architect Harold Caparn, who designed the Brooklyn Botanic Garden, to design an organic, curving, park-like layout of roads and trees. Cayuga Heights was incorporated as a village in 1915, consisting of a one-half square mile of land from the City of Ithaca line to what is now Upland Road. In 1924, Cayuga Heights Elementary School was built.

After World War II, Cayuga Heights continued to expand. Community Corners Shopping Center was built as a small suburban shopping plaza for residents in 1947. In 1952, the village opened its wastewater treatment plant on the shore of Cayuga Lake.

The village resisted attempts to be annexed by the growing City of Ithaca, and instead more than tripled in size in 1954 when it annexed approximately 1.4 square miles of land in the Town of Ithaca extending from Upland Road to the Town of Lansing border. A large addition was built onto Cayuga Heights Elementary School in the late 1950s. In 1969, the First Congregational Church relocated from downtown Ithaca to a new building on the former site of the Country Club of Ithaca, which had relocated a mile east.

The village was a founding member of the Bolton Point Water System when it opened in the mid-1970s. In 1980, Cayuga Heights Elementary School closed due to declining enrollment. It reopened in 1988.

In 1995, the last large plot of open land in Cayuga Heights, the former Savage Farm, was developed into a retirement community, Kendal at Ithaca, by the Kendal Corporation. Kendal has since become home to many retired Cornell University faculty members; a local joke for many years was that it had the best physics department in the country, as Nobel-prize winner Hans Bethe, along with Boyce McDaniel, Dale Corson, and many other physicists, were long-time residents.

On January 12, 2015, the board of trustees of the Village of Cayuga Heights unanimously adopted a resolution declaring freedom from domestic violence to be a fundamental human right.

Government and politics 
The main governmental body of the Village of Cayuga Heights is the board of trustees. Meetings are convened by the mayor or by an appointed deputy. The village offices are in Marcham Hall, a stone mansion built by a granddaughter of Ezra Cornell

Mayors
 Frederick G. Marcham, 1956 - 1987
 Ronald Anderson, 1988 - 2002
 Walter Lynn, 2003 - 2007
 Jim Gilmore, 2008 - 2012
 Kate Supron, 2012 - May 2016
 Linda Woodard, June 2016 - present

Fire Department
The Cayuga Heights Fire Department was founded in 1955 and provides fire, rescue, and ALS first-response emergency medical services to the village, areas of the Town of Ithaca, and parts of Cornell University. The department is an all-volunteer agency with response times averaging under three minutes. This is due to the department's dedicated volunteers, as well as the innovative and highly successful "bunker program" that allows for 7-8 Firefighter/EMTs to live in a second-floor dormitory and provide duty shifts in exchange for their room in the station. Unlike conventional membership recruiting/acceptance methods, the department recruits and restricts new member acceptance to bi-annual "recruit classes" in tandem with the academic semesters. As a result, many firefighters are Cornell students.

The department's current home, the Ronald E. Anderson Fire Station, was built in 2000 and named after the then-mayor. (The fire company is technically a 501(c)3 non-profit independent of the village, which allows it to sponsor annual fundraising drives.)

Police Department
The Cayuga Heights Police Department is a small department consisting of a chief, a sergeant, four full-time officers, a clerk, and several part-time officers and school crossing guards.

Geography
Cayuga Heights is located at  (42.466338, -76.488678), on the eastern slope of Cayuga Lake. The elevation ranges from 900 feet near Community Corners Shopping Center to 400 feet near the lake. Several streams and steep gorges cut through the village.

The village is at the south end of Cayuga Lake, one of the Finger Lakes.

Cayuga Heights borders, on its north, the Village of Lansing.

Two examples of old-growth oak/hickory forests are in the village: Palmer Woods, on the south side of the village near Cornell campus, and  Renwick Slope, on the far western part of the village by Cayuga Lake. Both are managed by Cornell Botanic Gardens.

The village has gotten national attention for its large population of white-tailed deer. In addition to deer, the village also hosts foxes, wild turkeys, squirrels, chipmunks, and rabbits.

Demographics

As of the census of 2000, there were 3,273 people, 1,497 households, and 772 families residing in the village. The population density was 1,850.9 people per square mile (714.0/km2). There were 1,584 housing units at an average density of 895.8 per square mile (345.5/km2). The racial makeup of the village was 85.73% White, 1.86% African American, 0.06% Native American, 8.95% Asian, 0.09% Pacific Islander, 1.19% from other races, and 2.11% from two or more races. Hispanic or Latino of any race were 3.57% of the population.

There were 1,497 households, out of which 17.9% had children under the age of 18 living with them, 47.5% were married couples living together, 2.8% had a female householder with no husband present, and 48.4% were non-families. 38.9% of all households were made up of individuals, and 14.8% had someone living alone who was 65 years of age or older. The average household size was 2.10, and the average family size was 2.71.

In the village, the population was spread out, with 15.3% under the age of 18, 14.1% from 18 to 24, 24.0% from 25 to 44, 22.6% from 45 to 64, and 24.0% who were 65 years of age or older. The median age was 42 years. For every 100 females, there were 95.8 males. For every 100 females age 18 and over, there were 94.9 males.

The median income for a household in the village was $74,258, and the median income for a family was $122,746. Males had a median income of $70,893 versus $33,621 for females. The per capita income for the village was $47,493. About 1.5% of families and 8.7% of the population were below the poverty line, including none of those under the age of eighteen or sixty-five or over.

Points of interest
 Community Corners Shopping Center, a boutique shopping center featuring The Heights Restaurant, Talbots, Gimme! Coffee, and several other businesses
 Kendal at Ithaca
 Pleasant Grove Cemetery
 RaNic Golf Club (formerly the Country Club of Ithaca)
 Sunset Park, a scenic village park bordered by stone arches with panoramic views of Ithaca College, the City of Ithaca, West Hill, and Cayuga Lake

Deer controversy

Cayuga Heights has received national attention for its large population of white-tailed deer, as many as 125 per square mile. Efforts to control the deer population have sparked huge controversy in the village.

In 2011, the village Board of Trustees approved a plan to reduce the deer population by sterilizing 20 to 60 does in two years while killing the remaining 160 to 200 deer in the village. Paul Curtis, a Natural Resources Professor at Cornell who has worked with the board of trustees, said "The primary problems that the deer cause to the community are damage to garden plants, deer-vehicle accidents and the potential threat of the spread of foreign diseases.” Opponents of the deer culling program have criticized it as a "war on sweet innocent deer", a "brutal slaughter", and Cayuga Heights as a "constant killing field". Local opposition group CayugaDeer.org has accused the board of trustees' actions as deceptive and dishonest, and sued the village to stop the culling. Few residents agreed to allow the village to cull deer on their property, and in November 2012, the board of trustees abandoned its plan to cull the deer, instead deciding to capture and sterilize does.

Notable people
 A.R. Ammons, poet and winner of the National Book Award for Poetry
 Hans Bethe, physicist and winner of the Nobel Prize
 Pearl S. Buck, writer, novelist, and winner of the Nobel Prize
 Vernon and Irene Castle, husband-and-wife team who appeared on Broadway and in silent films in the early 20th century; originated the Castle Walk and popularized the Foxtrot 
 Dorothy Cotton, civil rights activist and close associate of Martin Luther King Jr.
 Peter Debye, physicist and winner of the Nobel Prize
 Richard Feynman, physicist and winner of the Nobel Prize
 Louis Agassiz Fuertes, ornithologist, illustrator, and painter who is considered one of the most prolific American bird artists
 Thomas Gold, astrophysicist and professor of astronomy at Cornell University
 David Lee, physicist and winner of the Nobel Prize
 Vladimir Nabokov, novelist, poet, translator, and entomologist; professor of Russian literature at Cornell University
 Roy H. Park, entrepreneur and media mogul; founder of the Park Foundation 
 Carl Sagan, astronomer, popularizer of science, and Pulitzer Prize-winning author of The Dragons of Eden and Cosmos
 Kirkpatrick Sale, author who has written prolifically about political decentralism, environmentalism, luddism, and technology
 Steven Strogatz, mathematician and professor of applied mathematics at Cornell University

References

External links

The History Project at Cayuga Heights

Ithaca, New York
1915 establishments in New York (state)
Populated places established in 1915
Villages in Tompkins County, New York
Villages in New York (state)